Michaud is a surname of French origin, most often found in France, Canada and the United States. Notable people with the name include:
 Alexandre Michaud de Beauretour (1771–1841), Piedmontese general who served in the Imperial Russian Army
 Alexis Michaud (born 1975), French linguist
 Alfie Michaud (born 1976), Canadian ice hockey player
 Alice Morel-Michaud (born 1998), Canadian actress
 Andrée A. Michaud (born 1957), Canadian novelist and playwright
 Benoît Michaud (1902–1949), Canadian lawyer, notary, judge and politician
 Bruno Michaud (born 1935), Swiss football player and manager
 Cédric Michaud (born 1976), French marathon speed skater
 Charles-Olivier Michaud (born 1979), Canadian writer, film director and producer
 Claude Ignace François Michaud (1751–1835), French general
 Claude Michaud (1935–2014), French economist
 David Michaud (born 1988), American MMA fighter
 Denis Michaud (born 1946), Canadian Olympic luger
 Didier Michaud-Daniel (born 1958), French business executive
 Élaine Michaud (born 1985), Canadian politician
 Ernest Michaud (1884–1939), French trade union leader
 Hervé Michaud (1912–1978), Canadian politician
 Jacques Michaud (born 1951), French cyclist
 Jean Le Michaud d'Arçon (1733–1800), French general
 Jeff Michaud (born 1993), American soccer player
 John Stephen Michaud (1843–1908), American prelate of the Roman Catholic Church, Bishop of Burlington from 1899
 Joseph-Enoil Michaud (1888–1967), Canadian lawyer and politician
 Joseph François Michaud (1767–1839), French historian and publicist
 Joseph Michaud (Ontario politician) (1857–?), Canadian politician
 Kristina Michaud (born 1992/1993), Canadian politician
 Louis André Gaspard Michaud (1795–1880), French malacologist, known also as Gaspard Michaud or A. L. G. Michaud
 Louis Gabriel Michaud (1773–1858), French writer, historian, printer, and bookseller
 Maude Michaud (born 1986), Canadian screenwriter, filmmaker and actress
 Michel Michaud (born 1946), French chef working in Denmark
 Mike Michaud (born 1955), U.S. Congressman
 Mike Michaud (executive), co-founder of American online media production company Channel Awesome
 Olivier Michaud (born 1983), Canadian ice hockey player
 Patrice Michaud (born 1980), Canadian singer-songwriter
 Pierre Michaud (born 1936), Canadian lawyer and judge, Chief Justice of Quebec from 1994 to 2002
 Pius Michaud (1870–1956), Canadian lawyer and politician
 Ronald Michaud, 20th-century American cartoonist
 Sébastien Michaud (born 1987), Canadian Olympic taekwondo practitioner
 Stéphane Michaud (born 1944), French literary scholar
 Trennt Michaud (born 1996), Canadian pair skater
 Valérie Michaud (born 1970), French golfer
 Yves Michaud (politician) (born 1930), Canadian journalist and politician
 Yves Michaud (philosopher) (born 1944), French philosopher

See also 

 Michaud Affair
 Michaud River
 Michaux (disambiguation)

References

French-language surnames
Surnames of French origin